Ambro Emerson (1983–2002) was a champion trotting horse, raised in Ontario, Canada. He won 27 races and $1.47 million in earnings during his three-year career on the track.

Ambro Emerson was inducted into the Canadian Horse Racing Hall of Fame in 2005.

References
 Ambro Emerson's page at the Canadian Horse Racing Hall of Fame

See also
Harness racing

1983 racehorse births
2002 racehorse deaths
Canadian Standardbred racehorses
Canadian Horse Racing Hall of Fame inductees